3200 may refer to:

In general
 A.D. 3200, a year in the 4th millennium CE
 3200 BC, a year in the 4th millennium BCE
 3200, a number in the 3000 (number) range

Products
 Atari 3200, a videogame console
 CDC 3200, a minicomputer
 Motorola International 3200, the first digital cellphone
 Nokia 3200, a cellphone

Vehicles
 3200 horse power class tug, a Chinese navy tugboat class
 BMW 3200 CS, a sports car
 Maserati 3200 GT, a sports car
 Nord 3200, a military training aircraft

Rail
 3200-series (CTA), a rail car class
 GWR 3200 Class, a steam locomotive class

 Kintetsu 3200 series, an electric multiple unit train class
 Queensland Railways 3200 class, an electric locomotive class

Military units
 3200th Proof Test Group, of the U.S. Air Force
 3200th Drone Squadron, of the U.S. Air Force
 3200th Drone Group, of the U.S. Air Force

Other uses
 3200 Phaethon, a near-Earth asteroid, the 3200th asteroid registered
 Hawaii Route 3200, a state highway
 3200 m/3200 meters, an athletics track and field running distance
 ISO 3200, a film speed

See also

 A3200 road (Great Britain)
 PC2-3200, a type of DDR2 DRAM
 PC3200, a type of DDR1 DRAM